"Lady Godiva's Operation" is a song by the Velvet Underground from their second album, White Light/White Heat (1968).  The lyrics of the first half of the song, sung by John Cale, describe Lady Godiva; the lyrics of the second half, sung by Cale alternating with Lou Reed, are full of oblique, deadpan black humor and describe a botched surgical procedure, implied to be a lobotomy. Cale plays electric viola while Sterling Morrison plays bass, an instrument that he disliked, despite his competent abilities.

The song was covered by the Fatima Mansions as a single.

In 1973 Lou Reed said of the song  “Listen to the lyrics of my early songs, 'Lady Godiva’s Operation’ was about a trans-sexual."

Personnel
 John Cale – lead vocals, electric viola, medical instrument vocal noises
 Lou Reed – co-lead vocals, electric guitar
 Sterling Morrison – bass guitar, backing vocals, medical instrument vocal noises
 Maureen Tucker – percussion

References

The Velvet Underground songs
1968 songs
Songs written by Lou Reed
Lady Godiva
Song recordings produced by Tom Wilson (record producer)
Transgender-related songs